Maria of Russia may refer to:
Maria of Borovsk (1418-1484), wife of Vasily II of Moscow and mother of Ivan III of Russia
Maria of Tver (1442-1467), first wife of Ivan III of Russia and mother of Ivan the Young
Maria Vladimirovna of Staritsa (1560-1610), cousin of Ivan IV of Russia; wife of Magnus, King of Livonia, she was the last known descendant of Zoe Palaiologina

Empresses
 Maria Temryukovna (1544–1569), second wife of Ivan IV of Russia
 Maria Dolgorukaya (died 1580), seventh wife of Ivan IV of Russia
 Maria Nagaya (died 1608), eighth wife of Ivan IV of Russia
 Maria Grigorievna Skuratova-Belskaya (died 1605), wife of Boris Godunov
 Maria Buynosova-Rostovskaya (died 1626), second wife of Vasili IV of Russia
 Maria Dolgorukova (1601–1625), first wife of Michael I of Russia
 Maria Miloslavskaya (1625–1669), first wife of Alexis I of Russia
 Maria Feodorovna (Sophie Dorothea of Württemberg) (1759–1828), wife of Paul I of Russia
 Maria Alexandrovna (Marie of Hesse) (1824–1880), wife of Alexander II of Russia
 Maria Feodorovna (Dagmar of Denmark) (1847–1928), wife of Alexander III of Russia

Grand Duchesses
 Grand Duchess Maria Pavlovna of Russia (1786–1859), daughter of Paul I of Russia
 Grand Duchess Maria Alexandrovna of Russia (1799–1800), daughter of Alexander I of Russia
 Grand Duchess Maria Nikolaevna of Russia (1819–1876), daughter of Nicholas I of Russia
 Grand Duchess Maria Mikhailovna of Russia (1825–1846), daughter of Grand Duke Michael Pavlovich of Russia
 Grand Duchess Maria Alexandrovna of Russia (1853–1920), daughter of Alexander II of Russia
 Duchess Marie of Mecklenburg-Schwerin (1854–1920), wife of Grand Duke Vladimir Alexandrovich of Russia as Grand Duchess Maria Pavlovna of Russia, called "the Elder"
 Princess Maria of Greece and Denmark (1876–1940), wife of Grand Duke George Mikhailovich of Russia as Grand Duchess Maria Georgievna of Russia
 Grand Duchess Maria Pavlovna of Russia (1890–1958), daughter of Grand Duke Paul Alexandrovich of Russia, called "the Younger"
 Grand Duchess Maria Nikolaevna of Russia (1899–1918), daughter of Nicholas II of Russia
 Grand Duchess Maria Kirillovna of Russia (1907–1951), daughter of Grand Duke Cyril Vladimirovich of Russia
 Grand Duchess Maria Vladimirovna of Russia (born 1953), great-great-granddaughter of Alexander II of Russia, pretender to the title of Empress of Russia

See also
Maria (disambiguation)
Maria Alexandrovna (disambiguation)
Maria Feodorovna (disambiguation)
Maria Pavlovna (disambiguation)

ca:Maria de Rússia